Marko Kalogjera OL (December 7, 1819 – December 4, 1888), also known as Monsignor Marco Calogerà or Marco Calogjera, was a priest and Roman Catholic Bishop of Split and Makarska, present-day Croatia, and Kotor, present-day Montenegro. On September 7, 1881, he was awarded the title of Commander (Baron) of the Austrian Imperial Order of Leopold.

Biography
He was ordained on August 27, 1843, and served as chaplain for one year. He later served as chancellor of the Diocese of Dubrovnik for five years. In 1850, he served at the Mandaljena Parish. Between 1850 and 1852, he was Deputy Director of the Dubrovnik Seminary, and he was a professor in Zadar from 1853. In 1856, he was appointed Bishop of Kotor.

In 1869, he was appointed Bishop of Split and Makarska. During his time as bishop, he founded the Bishop's Palace and the Foundation of St. Cyril, where he was instrumental in preserving the ancient Glagolithic script. Kalogjera restored the burial ground and bell tower of St. Duje, built a new seminary in Split, and create the List of the Diocese of Split and Makarska. Many new churches were built in the Diocese of Split during his tenure as bishop.

Kalogjera was very patriotic, and he was friends with Don Mihovil Pavlinovich and Don Franko Bulich. He is credited for his guardianship of Croatian, and he was particularly responsible for the protection of the Glagolitic script and Slavic worship in Dalmatia.

See also
 House of Calogerà
 Roman Catholic Archdiocese of Split-Makarska
 Roman Catholic Diocese of Makarska
 Roman Catholic Diocese of Montenegro
 Glagolitic script

Notes

References

 Biskup Marko Kalogjera - o 120. obljetnici smrti 

1819 births
1888 deaths
Marko
Roman Catholic bishops of Kotor
Bishops of Split
Bishops appointed by Pope Pius IX
Roman Catholic bishops in the Kingdom of Dalmatia
19th-century Croatian Roman Catholic priests